MAATAC is a line of miniatures published in 1979 by Superior Models, Inc.

Contents
MAATAC Miniatures were released as packs of 2 to 4 miniature models of 1:285 scale tanks and robots, intended for the MAATAC science fiction game rules.

Reception
Steve Jackson reviewed MAATAC in The Space Gamer No. 34. Jackson commented that "If you want alien-looking tanks, these are the best available."

References

See also
List of lines of miniatures

Miniature figures